Organized Nature is a record label founded in the spring of 2005 by San Francisco DJs Gabriel & Dresden. The label is UK based via Gabriel & Dresden's management company and Plastic Fantastic Label Management.

Radio show
The label is also the name of their own international monthly radio show. It broadcasts on Proton Radio on the first Friday of the each month at Noon EST, it lasts 60 minutes with progressive electronica. With the separation of the managing duo in 2007-2008, Josh and Dave have set their monthly radio show on hiatus. But in 2014, February 3, they relaunch it, and play the 30th Episode on the progressive imprint of Digitally Imported Radio. Since that day, Organized Nature is diffused the first Monday of the month, on DI Progressive.

History
The first track to be released was "Arcadia" which gained large success on mainstream. Monochrome, is a Romanian trio consisting of Livio, Roby and George G who were declared the Global Winners of Heineken Thirst Studio competition, which was looking for fresh new producer talent. Gabriel & Dresden were judges at the finals of the contest and chose Monochrome.

Part of their prize for winning the Heineken Thirst Studio Competition and The People's Choice Award was to travel to the Palm Studios in Las Vegas to work on their track, "Pearl" with duo Gabriel & Dresden. The single was later released through the Organized Nature.

The label was brought back as an imprint of Armada in 2012 after the reunion of Gabriel & Dresden.  The first release will be Gabriel & Dresden vs Secret Panda Society - No Reservations.

Singles/EPs

ORGN001 Gabriel & Dresden - Arcadia
OND001 Josh Gabriel - Alive (Instrumental) / Dub Horizon
ORGN002 Gabriel & Dresden - Portobello / Serendipity
ORGN003 Özgür Can - Changed
ORGN004 Bigtop - Sub/Tidal
ORGN005 Gabriel & Dresden - Tracking Treasure Down
ORGN006 Gabriel & Dresden - Mass Repeat / Eleven
ORGN007 Retrobyte - Going Down
ORGN008 Gabriel & Dresden - Dangerous Power
ORGN009 Deep Flexion - Emotions of The Night
ORGN010 Josh Gabriel - Summit
ORGN011 Pearl - Monochrome
ORGN012 & 13 Gabriel & Dresden vs Secret Panda Society - No Reservations (2012)
ORGN014 Gabriel & Dresden (featuring Betsie Larkin) - Play it Back (2012)

Albums

ORGNCD001 Gabriel & Dresden - Gabriel & Dresden (Mixed)
ORGNCD006 Gabriel & Dresden - Gabriel & Dresden (Mixed) + (Unmixed)
ORGNCD101 Gabriel & Dresden - Gabriel & Dresden (2XCD)
ORGNCD002 Christopher Norman - unknown, forthcoming on 2008; delayed due to Gabriel & Dresden separation.

Artists
Özgür Can
Pearl
Gabriel & Dresden
Retrobyte (Christopher Norman)
Deep Flexion
Dave Dresden
Josh Gabriel
Bigtop
Motorcycle

See also
List of electronic music record labels

References

American record labels
Record labels established in 2005
Electronic music record labels